The Heart of America Bridge is a vehicular girder bridge over the Missouri River, in Kansas City, Missouri. It carries Route 9.  It was the vehicular replacement for the upper level of the ASB Bridge, and runs next to it a few hundred yards downstream.  It was opened in 1987.

In September 2010, a bi-directional bicycle and pedestrian path, separated from motorized traffic, was opened on the northbound span of the Heart of America Bridge. It is the first separated pedestrian crossing of the Missouri River in the Kansas City area. The Engineer of Record for this project is Burns & McDonnell Engineering Company.

See also
List of crossings of the Missouri River

References

Bridges in Kansas City, Missouri
Road bridges in Missouri
Girder bridges in the United States